Elizabeth Josephine Craig, MBE, FRSA (16 February 1883 – 7 June 1980) was a Scottish journalist, home economist and a notable author on cookery.

Early life and family
Elizabeth Craig was born on 16 February 1883 in Addiewell, West Lothian to Catherine Anne Nicoll (died 3 March 1929) and Reverend John Mitchell Craig. Craig was one of eight children and her father was a minister of the Free Church of Scotland. The family lived at the Manse in Memus, Kirriemuir, Scotland.

She attended Forfar Academy and George Watson's Ladies' College in Edinburgh before returning to Forfar Academy as a teacher.

Journalism
Craig's writing career began in Dundee where she studied journalism. She first published a cookery feature in the Daily Express in 1920, following comments from the Daily Mail's then film editor who declared she was "the only woman in Fleet Street who could cook". Craig was a founding member of the International P.E.N., and at the request of the founder, Catharine Dawson Scott, attended the first meeting of the association at the Florence Restaurant in London where John Galsworthy was elected its first president.

Cooking
Craig started to cook when she was six years old and began collecting recipes from age 12. She declared that the only formal training she had in cookery was a "three months course in Dundee". She began publishing cookery books after the end of World War I and proceeded through World War II and into the 1980s. She began writing in times when food was scarce and rationing was heavily relied upon, and her career ended when the majority of households had a refrigerator and an opportunity to access a much wider variety of foods: this can be observed in her writing as more diverse dishes appear in her later books. 

Her contribution to English culinary literature comprises a very large corpus of traditional British recipes, although not only this: included are also a considerable collection of recipes from other countries which she liked to collect during visits abroad.

Personal life 
Craig's engagement to American war correspondent and broadcaster Arthur E. Mann (died 9 June 1973) of Washington, D.C., was announced on 11 August 1919, and they were married at St Martin in the Fields Church, Trafalgar Square.

Publications

Cookery books

19??  The Woman's Journal Cookery Book
19??  Elizabeth Craig's Menus for a Year
19??  Elizabeth Craig's Springtime Cookery Book (The People's Friend)
1923  The Stage Favourites' Cook Book
1932  New Standard Cookery Illustrated
1932  Cooking with Elizabeth Craig
1932  The Up-to-Date Cookery Book
1933  Madeira: wine, cakes and sauce (In collaboration with André L. Simon)
1933  Entertaining with Elizabeth Craig (Illustrated by Herry Perry)
1934  Cakes and Candies: How to make them (Calendar with recipes)
1934  The Vicomte in the Kitchen (Georges, Vicomte de Mauduit's Cookery Book; introductions by Elizabeth Craig and  Frances, Countess of Warwick) 
1934  Elizabeth Craig's Standard Recipes
1934  Wine in the Kitchen
1934  Elizabeth Craig's Economical Cookery
1934  Elizabeth Craig's Simple Cooking
1935  Elizabeth Craig's Family Cookery: a new standard economical cookery on comprehensive lines
1935  Elizabeth Craig's Everyday Cooking
1936  Cookery Illustrated and Household Management
1936  Woman, Wine and a Saucepan
1936  Bubble and Squeak
1937  278 Tested Recipes
1940  Cooking in War-Time
1940  Cookery: a Time-Saving Cook Book
1940  1500 Everyday Menus
1950  Cooking for Today
1952  Elizabeth Craig's Practical Cooking
1953  Court Favourites; Recipes from Royal Kitchens
1955  Beer and 
1956  The Scottish Cookery Book (see also 1980)
1956  A Book of Mediterranean Food
1957  Instructions to Young Cooks
1957  Collins Family Cookery (see also 1971)
1958  Scandinavian Cooking
1959  A Cook's Guide to Wine
1960  Cottage Cheese and Yogurt
1962  Banana Dishes
1965  What's Cooking in Scotland
1965  The Penguin Salad Book
1965  Cook Continentale
1969  The Art of Irish Cooking
1970  The Business Woman's Cookbook
1971  Collins Family Cookery (see also 1957)
1978  Elizabeth Craig's Hotch Potch
1980  The Scottish Cookery Book (see also 1956)

Promotional recipe books
Unknown dates
19??  More Everyday Dishes (Tate & Lyle Sugars & Syrups)
19??  Primula Presents Recipes by Elizabeth Craig
19??  The Kikkoman Book of Recipes
19??  101 Recipes and Uses for Malt Vinegar (Malt Vinegar Brewers Association)

Known dates
1930  250 Recipes for use with Borwick's Baking Powder
1932  New Ways of using Custard (Foster Clark Ltd)
1934  The Importance of Eating Potatoes (Potato Marketing Board)
1937  The Way to a Good Table: electric cookery (British Electrical Development Association)
1938 (circa)  Cooking Made Easier (Foster Clark Ltd – c. 1938)
1940  OxO Meat Cookery! The Oxo Way
1940  Slim While You Eat, a calendar with over 100 recipes
1949 (circa)  Elizabeth Craig's Invalid Recipe Book (Benger's Food Limited – c. 1949)
1949  Chicken in the Kitchen
1954  Waterless Cooking (Milbro Vapour Seal Waterless Cookers)

Books on housekeeping and gardening 
1936  Elizabeth Craig's Simple Housekeeping
1936  The Housewives' Monthly Calendar
1936  Keeping House with Elizabeth Craig
1937  Modern Housekeeping
1937  Elizabeth Craig's Household Library (1937 onwards)
1938  Elizabeth's Craig's Simple Gardening
1940  Gardening with Elizabeth Craig (Gardening in wartime)
1941  Elizabeth Craig's Needlecraft
1947  Housekeeping: a book for the single-handed housewife
1947  1000 Household Hints
1948  Gardening with Elizabeth Craig; new edition
1950  Elizabeth Craig's Enquire Within
1952  Elizabeth Craig's Practical Gardening

References

Scottish food writers
Scottish journalists
Scottish women writers
Scottish women journalists
Members of the Order of the British Empire
PEN International
1883 births
1980 deaths
People from West Lothian
Place of death missing